Daniel Ciucă (born 1 June 1966) is a Romanian former footballer who played as a right defender. After he ended his playing career he worked as a sports agent and manager.

International career
Daniel Ciucă played three friendly games at international level for Romania, scoring one goal at his debut in a 2–0 victory against Israel.

References

1966 births
Living people
Romanian footballers
Romania international footballers
Association football defenders
Liga I players
Liga II players
2. Bundesliga players
3. Liga players
FC Progresul București players
FC Sportul Studențesc București players
FCV Farul Constanța players
Rot-Weiß Oberhausen players
SV Darmstadt 98 players
Romanian expatriate footballers
Expatriate footballers in Germany
Romanian expatriate sportspeople in Germany
Romanian football managers
Romanian expatriate football managers
Expatriate football managers in Germany
Association football agents
People from Reghin